The Bowdoin Project (officially entitled What does Bowdoin Teach? How a Contemporary Liberal Arts College Shapes Students) was an educational publication critiquing the educational practices of Brunswick, Maine-based liberal arts college Bowdoin College.

Overview

Reception 
The report was rebutted by the at-the-time President Barry Mills, who called the assessment, "mean-spirited and personal". President Mills responded multiple times after the college's initial response, concluding in a published report entitled "Setting the Record Straight" in The Daily Sun, in which he formalized his rejection by stating:
[The report was] financed at a cost of "well over $100,000" by an individual who has not spent more than a few hours on our campus and produced by a 25-year-old organization whose investigators have no first-hand experience with what we teach or how we teach it. It exaggerates its claims and misrepresents both what we do at Bowdoin and what we stand for. This is not just my reaction. It is the considered opinion of many members of our community, including those who ought to know best—our current students and their parents, and alumni who have spent many, many hours in our classrooms and labs, and who describe an experience very different from the one contained in this report.
One of the most covered sections of the report was one that questioned the college's patriotism, as well as asserting that its mission was "antithetical to the American experiment". Mills responded by stating:
[The report said] that our "worldview" and what we teach here [is] "antithetical to the American experiment" or that "Bowdoin on the whole shows little interest in the West." Frankly, it's hard to know where to begin with such nonsense. The American flag flies high over our campus atop a flagpole dedicated to our graduates who died in defense of America.

Many academic institutions and organizations sided with the college, calling the report, "a failed attack on Bowdoin [that] descended into disturbing conspiracy theories and wild speculation."

References

Bowdoin College